De Winton & Co (1854–1901) were engineers in Caernarfon, Wales. They built, amongst other things, vertical boilered narrow gauge locomotives for use in Welsh slate mines and other industrial settings. At least six De Winton locomotives have been preserved. But these quarry tramway locomotives, for which in the 21st century they are largely remembered, were just a small part of this company's engineering output.

Overview

The company had its origins in a small foundry built on the slate wharf at Caernarfon by Owen Thomas in the 1840s. He subsequently went into partnership with Jeffreys Parry de Winton and the firm developed as the Union Foundry. Manufactures included street gaslight columns and all manner of street furniture. When the Carnarvonshire Railway was being built under Castle Square, the tunnel roof was supported by iron beams supplied by De Winton's and their name can still be seen at the entrance to the tunnel, which is now used as a road underpass.

The foundry was a major supplier to the Caernarfon and Liverpool ship building industry. The firm built marine steam engines up to 200 bhp powered by boilers that they also made. These marine engines influenced the quarry locomotives that they made. Over 60 were produced over a 25-year period. They also built stationary steam engines and the engine preserved at Parc Glynllifon near Caernarfon is the second oldest working stationary engine in Britain.

De Winton's supplied the quarry industry and made whatever might be needed. At the large and very profitable Dinorwic Quarry in Llanberis, in 1870, De Winton's built and equipped an entire workshop with machinery powered by overhead shafting that in its turn was driven by the largest water wheel in the United Kingdom (over 50 feet in diameter), which remained in daily use until 1925 when it was replaced by a Pelton wheel but retained as standby. The wheel is the subject of a preservation order but in fact the entire workshop complex is preserved as the National Slate Museum.

Jeffreys Parry de Winton (born Wilkins 1828–1892) was mayor of Caernarfon (1870–1872) when his company was one of the rising enterprises in the town. The Company remained in his hands and important in Caernarfon's maritime activities until about 1890. In its decline from that time it appears to have been badly managed and heavily committed to a French invention that failed and brought bankruptcy in 1901. Some of the De Winton works in St Helen's Road survives. Since 1988 it has been the home of a local plumbing and heating business; before that the foundry was used as a bonded warehouse and wine merchants. It stands opposite Caernarfon station of the Welsh Highland Railway.

The steam engine at Glynllifon was restored by Fred Dibnah after he was originally called to the park to quote for the demolition of the chimney.

De Winton locomotives 

The De Winton records were not preserved, so the complete list of locomotives produced is not known.

References

External links 

 de-winton home page

Locomotive manufacturers of the United Kingdom
Slate industry in Wales